Somerville Hastings, FRCS (4 March 1878 – 7 July 1967) was a British surgeon and  Labour Party politician.

Early life and career
The son of the Reverend H G Hastings, he was born in Warminster, Wiltshire. He was educated at Wycliffe College (Gloucestershire), University College London (receiving the gold and silver medals for botany) and the Middlesex Hospital, London. He qualified as MRCS LRCP in 1902, FRCS in 1904 and MB (London) in 1908.

On 19 October 1911 Hastings married Bessie Tuke (1882–1958), the daughter of the architect William Tuke. They had two children.

Working life
Hastings was Member of Parliament (MP) for Reading, in Berkshire, from 1923 to 1924, and from 1929 to 1931.  He returned to the House of Commons at the 1945 general election as MP for Barking, holding the seat until his retirement at the 1959 general election.

Thora Silverthorne worked for Hastings as a nanny and went on to be secretary of the Socialist Medical Association.

Hastings was founder President of the Socialist Medical Association (SMA) 1930–51. He served in the Royal Army Medical Corps during the First World War, followed by work as an aural surgeon at the Middlesex Hospital. He was a Member of the London County Council for fourteen years.  Edith Summerskill felt that the "idea of a National Health Service germinated in the hospitable atmosphere" of Hastings’ home.  He successfully proposed a resolution at the 1934 Labour Party Conference that the party should be committed to the establishment of a State Health Service.  He was a member of the Party's Medical Services sub-committee which produced the report A State Health Service which was accepted as the basis for the Party's policy.

Death 
Somerville Hastings died at the Royal Berkshire Hospital, Reading, on 7 July 1967, aged 89.

Publications
Hastings was the author of: 
Toadstools at Home (1906)
Wild Flowers at Home (1906)
Alpine Plants At Home (1908)
Summer Flowers Of The High Alps (1910)
First Aid for the Trenches (1917)
The Future of Medical Practice in England The Lancet (1928)
Fabian Tracts no. 241 A National Physiological Minimum (January 1934)
The Future of Medical Practice: A Personal View (1942)
The Development of the Health Services (February 1943) (and many other leaflets and tracts for the Socialist Medical Association)
The Family And The Social Services with Peggy Jay (February 1965)

References

External links 

1878 births
1967 deaths
Labour Party (UK) MPs for English constituencies
Members of London County Council
Members of the Parliament of the United Kingdom for Reading
UK MPs 1923–1924
UK MPs 1929–1931
UK MPs 1945–1950
UK MPs 1950–1951
UK MPs 1951–1955
UK MPs 1955–1959
National Health Service people
20th-century English medical doctors
Alumni of University College London
English health activists
English surgeons
Royal Army Medical Corps officers
British Army personnel of World War I
Fellows of the Royal College of Surgeons
20th-century surgeons